HLA-B44 (B44) is an HLA-B serotype. The serotype identifies the B*44 gene-allele protein products of HLA-B.

B44 is a split antigen of the broad antigen B12, and is a sister type of B45.

Serotype

Alleles

Disease
HLA-B44 increases recurrent sinopulmonary infections. Protective effects: HLA-B44 appears to be protective against autoimmune lymphoproliferative syndrome in patients with C95 defect (ALPS type Ia). B44 may be a cofactor in ankylosing spondylitis

References

4